Sandros Kumwenda (born 27 July 1976 in Lundazi) is a Zambian international footballer.

Career
Sandros Kumwenda began his professional career for the Chipata amateur side. Later he played for the Dynamos Harare and Mighty Wanderers F.C.

Honours
Zimbabwe Premier Soccer League:
Runners-up: 1999
Zimbabwean Charity Shield:
Winners: 2002.

References

1976 births
Living people
People from Lundazi District
Association football midfielders
Zambia international footballers
Zambian footballers
Zambian expatriate footballers
Expatriate footballers in Zimbabwe
Dynamos F.C. players
Expatriate footballers in Malawi
Mighty Wanderers FC players